Clearfield station is a commuter rail station in Clearfield, Utah, United States served by the FrontRunner, Utah Transit Authority's (UTA) commuter rail train that operates along the Wasatch Front with service from Ogden in  central Weber County through Davis County, Salt Lake City, and Salt Lake County to Provo in central Utah County.

Description
The station is located at 1250 South State Street (SR-126) on approximately 73 acres of land and has easy access from I-15 by either 700 South (SR-193) or West Antelope Drive (SR-108). It was anticipated to provide commuter service to the approximately 22,600 employees at Hill Air Force Base and the approximately 8,500 employees at the Freeport Center. The station is also within walking distance of the Clearfield City offices, North Davis Junior High School, and Clearfield High School.

The station has a free Park and Ride lot with about 560 parking spaces available. The station is located within the Quiet Zone, so trains do not routinely sound their horns when approaching public crossings within this corridor. The inaugural FrontRunner train departed the station southbound at 9:00 am April 26, 2008. The station is operated by Utah Transit Authority.

References

External links 
Clearfield Station Quick Facts

Buildings and structures in Davis County, Utah
Clearfield, Utah
Railway stations in the United States opened in 2008
UTA FrontRunner stations
2008 establishments in Utah
Railway stations in Davis County, Utah